RAF Wainfleet was a Royal Air Force weapons range on The Wash on the east coast of England near Wainfleet, in the civil parish of Friskney, although the north-east part of the range was in Wainfleet St Mary. Other ranges nearby include RAF Holbeach, also on The Wash, and RAF Donna Nook. It was also known as The Wash (North side) Bombing Range. It was only a few miles south-west of Gibraltar Point.

History
The range opened to aerial operations in August 1938; but had previously been used as a range from 1890 by the 1st Lincolnshire Artillery. However, there is evidence that the area was in use for military practice as far back as Napoleonic times when the River Steeping was navigable and Wainfleet itself was an important harbour.

During the 1920s and 1930s it was also used by the RAF and Royal Artillery. The range was administered by RAF Coningsby as an Air Weapons Range within RAF Strike Command.  During the Second World War, it was used by 617 Squadron to test the Stabilizing Automatic Bomb Sight. Postwar, it was used by both fixed wing and rotary aircraft from NATO.  On 1 April 2006 control was transferred to Defence Estates and the range was then administered by Defence Training Estates (East) from their headquarters at West Tofts Camp near Thetford.

Due to funding cuts the range was closed for operations on 2 December 2009 and finally closed in July 2010.

The tower and some surrounding buildings reopened as holiday accommodation in 2017.

Operation
The site was controlled from the Control Tower. Targets included old ships. There were two smaller wooden observation towers to the east nearer the shore but these were demolished in 2009. Access was via a narrow road called Sea Lane via the junction with the A52 at the Barley Mow at Friskney Eaudyke.

Weapons clearance
The site was cleared daily by the Explosive Ordnance Disposal team from RAF Coningsby. Although the range has finally closed unrecovered ordnance and unexploded ordnance will remain for many years.

SSSI
The range area is a Site of Special Scientific Interest thanks to the large number of resident and migrating birds found there. The location is a major stopping point for flocks of brent geese on their way from the Arctic coast. There is also the red-legged partridge. Skegness gets its weather recorded from the automatic equipment at Wainfleet.

References

Bibliography

External links
 RAF website
 History of the site
 Photographic gallery
 2001 Bombing competition
 1999 Bombing competition
 Defence Estates
 Abandoned seal found on the bombing range

Video clips
 Weapons burst by an A-10 Thunderbolt II
 F-15

Wainfleet
Wainfleet
Wainfleet
Sites of Special Scientific Interest in Lincolnshire
East Lindsey District